Jon Crossland is a British designer and illustrator, known for having collaborated with great names in music designing the covers and leaflets of their albums, highlighting among many others, his collaboration with Pink Floyd, Kansas, Alan Parsons, Bruce Dickinson, The Cranberries, etc.

Crossland attended St Martin's School of Art, London, graduating in 1987 with a degree in graphic design. His first job out of college was as Neville Brody's assistant at his former studio in Tottenham Court Road. He worked extensively with Storm Thorgerson throughout the 1990s and contributed several designs, most notably Pink Floyd's 'Pulse' album cover. He has worked extensively in London and the United States as a freelance designer and illustrator. His poster design 'Stop The Burning' is on archive at the Victoria & Albert Museum in London.

Work 
Some of the most outstanding works are:

 1988: Pink Floyd - Delicate Sound of Thunder
 1988: Kansas - In the Spirit of Things
 1995: Alan Parsons - Alan Parsons Live
 1995: Renaissance - Da Capo
 1995: Towering Inferno - Kaddish
 1995: Pink Floyd - Pulse
 1995: CD edition of Relics
 1996: The Almighty - Just Add Life
 1996: Bruce Dickinson - Skunkworks
 1997: Fred Frith - Previous Evening
 1997: Moodswings - Psychedelicatessen
 1997: Jon Rose - Shopping.Live@Victo
 1997: Phish - Slip, Stitch and Pass
 1998: Ian Dury / Ian Dury & the Blockheads - Mr Love Pants
 1999: The Cranberries - Bury the Hatchet
 1999: The Cranberries - Promises
 2000: International Music Series: Music of Italy
 2000: International Music Series: Celtic Fiddle
 2000: International Music Series: French Cafe Accordion
 2000: International Music Series: Memories of Greece
 2000: Guo Yi / Guo Yue - International Music Series: Music of China
 2000: Jonathan Mayer - International Music Series: Music of India
 2000: Tito Heredia / Dario Rossetti-Bonell - International Music Series: Spanish Guitar
 2002: Healing Sixes - Enormosound
 2002: The Cranberries - Treasure Box: The Complete Sessions, 1991-1999

References

External links 
 

Year of birth missing (living people)
Living people
British graphic designers
Pink Floyd